Yves Jacques OC (born 10 May 1956) is a Canadian film, television and stage actor.

Life and career 
Jacques was born in Quebec City in 1956. He studied theatre at the Cégep de Saint-Hyacinthe, and began acting on stage in both Quebec City and Montreal. He became more widely known to film and television audiences beginning in 1981 as a sketch performer in Télévision de Radio-Canada's annual Bye Bye New Year's Eve variety special, and soon began appearing more widely in film and television roles. To international audiences, he is best known as Claude, the gay academic in Denys Arcand's The Decline of the American Empire and The Barbarian Invasions. On stage, he is noted for originating the role of Lydie-Anne in the premiere of Michel Marc Bouchard's play Lilies.

He has been in several movies by French filmmaker Claude Miller, including Of Woman and Magic and Little Lili. His fame has continued to grow with films and theatrical productions in both France and Quebec. Since 2001, he has toured the world in two shows by Robert Lepage, Far Side of the Moon (La Face cachée de la lune) and Le Projet Andersen, where he played all the roles. Since 2018, he has appeared regularly in Mathieu Quesnel’s theatrical creations. More recently, he played in Aline by Valérie Lemercier, in Maria by Alec Pronovost, and in Chloé Robichaud’s Les jours heureux. In 2022, Yves Jacques played in Martin Villeneuve's The 12 Tasks of Imelda (Les 12 travaux d'Imelda), co-starring playwright Robert Lepage and actress-signer Ginette Reno.

He was named Chevalier de l’Ordre des Arts et des Lettres by the Ministère de la Culture et de la Communication de France in February 2001, and was appointed an Officer of the Order of Canada in 2009, for his performances in theatre, television and film, in Canada and abroad.

He is openly gay.

Filmography 
Cinema
 1982 : Les Yeux rouges by Yves Simoneau
 1983 : Sonatine by Micheline Lanctôt : The Subway Station Janitor
 1984 : The Crime of Ovide Plouffe (Le Crime d'Ovide Plouffe) by Denys Arcand : Bob
 1985 : Hold-Up by Alexandre Arcady : Otage 400 S
 1986 : The Decline of the American Empire (Le Déclin de l'empire américain) by Denys Arcand : Claude
 1989 : Jesus of Montreal (Jésus de Montréal) by Denys Arcand : Richard Cardinal
 1990 : Ding et Dong (Ding et Dong: le film) by Alain Chartrand : Jigi
 1990 : Miléna Nova Tremblay by Claude Désorcy
 1991 : Milena by Véra Belmont : Max Brod
 1991 : Montreal Stories (Montréal vu par...)
 1993 : Trois femmes un amour by Robert Favreau
 1994 : Meurtre en musique by Gabriel Pelletier : Simon Claveau
 1994 : Louis 19, King of the Airwaves (Louis 19, le roi des ondes) (Reality Show) by Michel Poulette : Michel Gobeil
 1995 : Alfred by Vilgot Sjöman : Georges Fehrenbach
 1998 : Michael Kael contre la World News Company by Christophe Smith : Charles Robert
 1998 : Class Trip by Claude Miller : The Visitor
 1999 : Memories Unlocked (Souvenirs intimes) by Jean Beaudin : Mortimer
 1999 : La Chambre des magiciennes by Claude Miller : D. Fish (telefilm shown in theatres)
 1999 : La Veuve de Saint-Pierre by Patrice Leconte : Le contre-amiral
 2000 : Life After Love (La Vie après l'amour) by Gabriel Pelletier : Docteur Bilodeau
 2000 : Requiem contre un plafond by Jeremy Peter Allen : Le désespéré
 2001 : Wedding Night (Nuit de noces) by Émile Gaudreault : Bernard
 2001 : Betty Fisher et autres histoires by Claude Miller : René the Canadian
 2002 : The Collector (Le Collectionneur) by Jean Beaudin : François Berger / Babette Brown
 2002 : Séraphin: Heart of Stone (Séraphin: un homme et son péché) by Charles Binamé : Notaire Le Potiron
 2003 : The Barbarian Invasions by Denys Arcand : Claude
 2003 : La Petite Lili by  Claude Miller : Serge
 2004 : Ordo : Richard Féraud
 2004 : The Aviator by Martin Scorsese : Un serveur
 2005 : La Petite Chartreuse : Baldi
 2005 : Let's Be Friends by Olivier Nakache and Eric Toledano : Germain
 2005 : Aurore by Luc Dionne : Curé Leduc
 2005 : Désaccord parfait by Antoine de Caunes : Le docteur Trudeau
 2006 : Un secret by Claude Miller : Georges
 2007 : 48 heures par jour by Catherine Castel : Arnaud
 2009 : Je vais te manquer by Amanda Sthers
 2010 : The Comeback (Cabotins) by Alain DesRochers : Lady Moon
 2010 : La dernière fugue by Léa Pool : André
 2011 : French Immersion by Kevin Tierney
 2011 : Voyez comme ils dansent
 2012 : Laurence Anyways
 2013 : Me, Myself and Mum
 2015 : Families
 2017 : Father and Guns 2 (De père en flic 2)
 2019 : Forgotten Flowers (Les fleurs oubliées) : Marie-Victorin Kirouac
 2020 : Villa Caprice
 2021 : Maria
 2021 : Aline
 2022 : The 12 Tasks of Imelda (Les 12 travaux d'Imelda) : Veterinarian

 Short films
 2001 : Via Crucis by Serge Denoncourt
 2001 : Requiem contre un plafond by Jeremy Peter Allen
 2007 : Silence ! on voudrait bien s'aimer by Alain Minot

 Television
 1980 : Boogie-woogie 47 (TV series) : Denis St-Cyr
 1983 : Poivre et sel (TV series) : Pierrot Séguin
 1993 : La Voyageuse du soir (TV) : Arthur
 1994 : Jalna (TV cartoon)
 1994 : Baldipata by Michel Lang
 1995 : V'la l'cinéma ou le roman de Charles Pathé (TV) : René Lampin
 1995 : Belle Époque (TV cartoon) : Augustin
 1997 : Ces enfants d'ailleurs (TV series) : Jan Pawlowski / Jean Aucoin
 1997 : Bob Million by Michaël Perrotta : Bob Million
 1998 : Changement de cap (TV) : Cariou
 1999 : Three Seasons (TV) : Henry
 1999 : La Soirée des Jutras (TV) : EmCee
 2000 : La Soirée des Jutras (TV) : Host
 2001 : Thérèse et Léon (TV) : Marcel Bouchard
 2001 : L'Aîné des Ferchaux (TV) by Bernard Stora : Me Jacquin
 2002 : Napoléon (TV cartoon) : Lucien
 2004 : H2O (TV) : Québec Premier Marcel Coté
 2005 : L'État de Grace by Pascal Chaumeil : Bertrand Saint-Amor
 2006 : Mafiosa by Louis Choquette : Zamponi

Distinctions

Awards

Nominations 
 Nominated for the prix Jutra for best actor in 2000 for Souvenirs intimes

Music 
In 1981, he was singer-songwriter of the song On ne peut pas tous être pauvres (music by composerPierre Gagnon). Jacques also produced and realised(directed) the music video which is the first Québécois music video.

References

External links 

 

1956 births
Living people
Officers of the Order of Canada
Canadian male film actors
Canadian male television actors
Canadian male stage actors
Male actors from Quebec City
Canadian gay actors
20th-century Canadian male actors
21st-century Canadian male actors
21st-century Canadian LGBT people
20th-century Canadian LGBT people